Amalda edithae is a species of sea snail, a marine gastropod mollusk in the family Ancillariidae.

Description

Distribution

References

Proceedings of the Royal Society of Victoria new ser. 11(2): 179–184
Proceedings of the Royal Society of Victoria new ser. 11(2): 185–208

External links

 Image of paratype at MNHN, Paris

edithae
Gastropods described in 1898